The 2009 All-Ireland Senior Hurling Championship was the 123rd staging of the All-Ireland Senior Hurling Championship, the Gaelic Athletic Association's premier inter-county hurling tournament. The draw for the 2000 fixtures took place on 8 October 2008. The championship began on 30 May 2009 and ended on 6 September 2009.

Kilkenny were the defending champions. Antrim and Galway joined the Leinster Championship for the first time.

On 6 September 2009, Kilkenny won the championship following a 2-22 to 0-23 defeat of Tipperary in the All-Ireland final. This was their 32nd All-Ireland title overall, their 7th championship of the decade and a record-equalling fourth All-Ireland title in-a-row.

Galway's Joe Canning was the championship's top scorer with 3-46. Kilkenny's Tommy Walsh won Hurler of the Year.

Provincial changes

Due to a lack of competition in their own respective provinces, Antrim and Galway pushed for entry to the Leinster Championship. At a special meeting of Congress on 4 October 2008, delegates voted to include Galway and Antrim in a restructured Leinster Championship on a trial basis for three years. Dublin, Wexford and Offaly spoke against the move, however, when put to a vote approximately 80% of delegates voted in favour.

Teams

A total of 12 teams competed in the championship, including all of the teams from the 2008 championship. There were no new entrants. On 3 August 2008, Westmeath won the Christy Ring Cup for the second year in succession, however, there was no promotion mechanism for them to join the top flight.

Personnel and team details

Managerial changes

Format
The format of the 2009 championship was slightly different from previous years.  Firstly, Galway have had no opposition in the Connacht Senior Hurling Championship since 2004.  Due to this it was decided at a special meeting of the GAA's congress for Galway to join the Leinster Senior Hurling Championship for a three-year trial period, starting with the 2009 championship.  Antrim, being the only Tier 1 team in the Ulster Senior Hurling Championship, also participated in the Leinster Championship on a three-year trial period.  Antrim also competed in the Ulster Championship which was run as a separate tournament to the All-Ireland Hurling Championship.

12 counties participated in Tier 1 of the 2009 Championship.  These teams were as follows:
 Leinster: Antrim, Dublin, Galway, Kilkenny, Laois, Offaly and Wexford 
 Munster: Clare, Cork, Limerick, Tipperary, Waterford

Provincial Championships
The Munster championship was played as usual with five teams. The Leinster championship also proceeded as usual, except for the addition of both Antrim and Galway, bringing the total number of competing teams to seven.  The Leinster and Munster champions advanced directly to the All-Ireland semi-finals.

All-Ireland Qualifiers
The qualifiers gave teams defeated in the provincial championships another chance at winning the All-Ireland.
Phase 1: (2 matches) the three Leinster quarter-finalists and the Munster quarter-finalist play off.
Phase 2: (2 matches) the two Leinster semi-finalists and two Munster semi-finalists play off.
Phase 3: (2 matches) The four winners of Phase 1 and Phase 2 games meet in Phase 3. The two Phase 3 winners advance to the All-Ireland quarter-finals.

All-Ireland Series
Quarter-finals: (2 matches) The defeated Munster and Leinster finalists played the winners of the Phase 3 qualifiers.
Semi-finals: (2 matches) The Munster and Leinster champions played the winners of the quarter-finals.

Promotion/Relegation

Promotion and relegation between Tier 1 and Tier 2 was in operation in the 2009 championship. The defeated team in the Round 2 match of the Relegation playoffs was demoted to the 2010 Christy Ring Cup, to be replaced by the winners of the 2009 Christy Ring Cup.

Leinster Senior Hurling Championship

Munster Senior Hurling Championship

Qualifiers

Relegation play-offs 

It was intended to hold a relegation playoff between Antrim and Wexford, but instead it was decided to allow both compete in the 2010 championship.

All-Ireland Series

Championship facts

Scoring
First goal of the championship: Stephen Banville for Wexford against Offaly (Leinster quarter-final)
Last goal of the championship: Martin Comerford for Kilkenny against Tipperary (All-Ireland final)
First hat-trick of the championship: Niall Healy for Galway against Laois (Leinster quarter-final)
Widest winning margin: 27 points
Galway 5-29 : 0-17 Laois (Leinster quarter-final)
Most goals in a match: 8
Tipperary 6-19 : 2-7 Limerick (All-Ireland semi-final)
Most points in a match: 46 
Galway 5-29 : 0-17 Laois (Leinster quarter-final)
Most goals by one team in a match: 6
Tipperary 6-19 : 2-7 Limerick (All-Ireland semi-final)
Most goals scored by a losing team: 3
Galway 3-13 : 2-20 Kilkenny (Leinster quarter-final)
Waterford 3-15 : 2-23 Kilkenny (All-Ireland semi-final)
Most points scored by a losing team: 23 
Tipperary 0-23 : 2-22 Kilkenny (All-Ireland final)

Player facts

Retirees
The following players played their last game in the 2009 championship:

Monthly awards

Statistics

Top scorers overall

Top scorers in a single game

Clean sheets

References

External links
All-Ireland Hurling Championship Results
Official GAA Website
RTÉ Sport Website
Hurling Statistics

All-Ireland Senior Hurling Championship
All-Ireland Senior Hurling Championships